The 2005 edition of the Fort Worth Bowl (later known as the Armed Forces Bowl), the third edition, featured the Kansas Jayhawks and the Houston Cougars.

Game summary
Brian Murph of Kansas scored the first points of the game on an 85-yard touchdown return of a punt to give Kansas an early 7–0 lead. Houston's Ben Bell answered in the second quarter with a 32-yard field goal making it 7–3. Kansas quarterback Jason Swanson fired a 13-yard touchdown pass to Jon Cornish making it 14–3 Kansas. With 57 seconds left in the first half, Houston quarterback Kevin Kolb scored on a 1-yard touchdown run bringing it to 14–10 at halftime.

In the third quarter, Jason Swanson again found Jon Cornish for a 30-yard touchdown pass, increasing Kansas's lead to 21–10. T.J. Lawrence of Houston kicked a 44-yard field goal for Houston to make it 21–13. Jason Swanson later threw a 32-yard touchdown pass to Mark Simmons, giving Kansas a 28–13 lead.

In the fourth quarter, defensive end Charlton Keith intercepted a Houston pass and returned it 14 yards for a touchdown, making it 35–13. Jason Swanson's 48-yard touchdown pass to Brian Murph capped the scoring at 42–13 Kansas.

External links
USAToday.com recap of game

References

Fort Worth Bowl
Armed Forces Bowl
Houston Cougars football bowl games
Kansas Jayhawks football bowl games
2005 in sports in Texas
December 2005 sports events in the United States